Jainagar is a village in Maharashtra state, Nandurbar district, of India with pin code 425423. The village is home to the Heramb Ganesh Temple.

External links 
https://maps.google.co.in/maps?client=safari&hl=en&noj=1&um=1&ie=UTF-8&fb=1&gl=in&entry=s&sa=X&ftid=0x3bdf3fe85c45ade9:0xd0f8b32a8f749128&gmm=CgIgAQ%3D%3D  website for Heramb Ganesh Temple, accessed 13 November 2017

Villages in Nandurbar district